Yvette McLellan is a Paralympic athletics competitor from Australia.  She won a pair of silver medals at the 1988 Seoul Games in the Women's 400 m 2 event and the Women's 4 × 400 m Relay 2-6 event.

References

Paralympic athletes of Australia
Athletes (track and field) at the 1988 Summer Paralympics
Paralympic silver medalists for Australia
Living people
Medalists at the 1988 Summer Paralympics
Year of birth missing (living people)
Paralympic medalists in athletics (track and field)
Australian female wheelchair racers